The 1995–96 Danish 1st Division season was the 51st season of the Danish 1st Division league championship and the 10th consecutive as a second tier competition governed by the Danish Football Association.

The division-champion and runner-up promoted to the 1996–97 Danish Superliga. The teams in the 13th to 16th spots relegated between the Danish 2nd Division East and West 1996-97.

Table

Top goalscorers

See also
 1995–96 in Danish football
 1995–96 Danish Superliga

External links
 Peders Fodboldstatistik

Danish 1st Division seasons
Denmark
2